Hopea utilis is a species of plant in the family Dipterocarpaceae. It is native to Kerala and Tamil Nadu in India.

References

utilis
Flora of Kerala
Flora of Tamil Nadu
Endangered plants
Taxonomy articles created by Polbot